Plat du Jour is a studio album by British electronic musician Matthew Herbert. It was released on Accidental Records in 2005. The album was created using the sounds of food preparation and production. "Celebrity" features a vocal contribution from Dani Siciliano.

Critical reception 
At Metacritic, which assigns a weighted average score out of 100 to reviews from mainstream critics, Plat du Jour received an average score of 73% based on 12 reviews, indicating "generally favorable reviews".

Tim O'Neil of PopMatters gave the album 8 stars out of 10, saying, "the juxtaposition of Herbert's precise, seemingly innocent and light-hearted rhythms with heavier themes of economic exploitation and death creates an effective and practical dialectic." Rob Woo of Exclaim! called it "one of the most bizarre concept albums to date".

The Wire listed the album on their "2005 Rewind" list.

Track listing

References

External links 
 

2005 albums
Matthew Herbert albums